Kazakh rebellions are events and actions in the history of Kazakhstan in which the Kazakh people engaged in civil disobedience or armed resistance to state power. The national uprisings of the Kazakhs in the 18th–19th centuries are commonly referred to as national liberation uprisings.

From the middle of the nineteenth century until 1916, there were 300 national liberation movements, wars and uprisings in Kazakhstan.

The 18th century

Kazakhs in the Pugachev's Rebellion

The first joint action of Kazakh and Russian people against autocracy was the active participation of Kazakhs in Pugachev's Rebellion in 1773–1775. The main reason for Kazakh participation was the land issue. In 1742 Nuraly khan, under pressure from the people, demanded that the government remove restrictions on grazing along the Ural River, but the Russian government refused.

In the second half of the 18th century, the Kazakhs of Junior zhuz suffered even more from the Russian colonial policy and the aggressive actions of the Yaitskiy Cossack Army. In 1756 the Imperialist government, protecting the interests of the Cossack troops, forbade the Cossacks to nomadize on the right bank of the Ural.

During the peasant war led by Pugachev, the famous biy Dautbai urged the Kazakhs to actively support the rebels. Kazakh detachments were united on tribal grounds. One of the leaders of the insurgent units was a Kazakh batyr Syrym Datuly. The Kazakh troops were the main striking force in the capture of the Kulagin fortress. Nuraly khan, having dual-position  tried to use the rebellion for the return of the seized lands. The steppe aristocracy sought to weaken the royal position in Kazakhstan.

In 1771 some of the Volga Kalmyks attempted to migrate through Kazakhstan to their historical homeland, Dzungaria, but were defeated by the Kazakhs.

Revolt led by Sapara Matenkyzy

1775—1776 - an uprising led by Sapara Matenkyzy. The main uprising: repression by the Russian Empire, royal prohibitions about the land, the Ural Cossacks. 10,000 people participated in the uprising. Alexander Suvorov went to suppress the uprising. But his army was driven back, and later Sapara Matenkyzy burned the cities and fortresses bordering the Russian Empire.

Rebellion of Syrym Datuly

The Kazakhs of Junior zhuz led by Syrym Datuly revolted in 1783–1797, due to the outrages of Cossacks. In 1778, during one of the armed clashes with the Cossack detachments, children of Syrym Datuly were killed.

The main driving force behind this rebellion was the Kazakh poor, the "sharua", Kazakhs who saw the cause of all their troubles in maintaining the personal power of Nuraly Khan. The deepening agrarian crisis in the second half of the 18th century weakened the positions of the khan's surroundings and strengthened the opposition against the successors of khan Abulkhair. Wary of the wrath of the insurgents, Nuraly khan moved to the Ural Cossack line.

Mass participation of the Kazakhs of Junior Juz in the peasant war of 1773–1775 was a consequence of the weakening the position of the khan Nuraly. During the uprising, relations between Nuraly Khan and the Orenburg governor Baron O.Igelstrom were strained, as the baron supported Syrym Datuly. Compromise between Igelstrom and Syrym Datuly concerned the issue of the destruction of the khan's power in the Junior zhuz. Prior to the outright struggle, S.Datuly believed that the end of the displacement of the Kazakhs from their tribal nomadic lands could be achieved by force of persuasion.

During the uprising of 1783–1797, Baron Igelstrom proposed a new system of governance for the Junior zhuz. According to Igelstrom's plan, all power in the Junior zhuz was concentrated in the hands of the Frontier Court. During the uprising, the inconsistency of Datuly manifested itself in the fact that he, against the Khan's grouping, supported the reform project of Igelstrom. The Russian government refused to carry out the reforms of Igelstrom in the Junior juz because of the growing anti-monarchist sentiment in Russia.

During the uprising of Kazakhs in 1783–1797 years punitive detachments, unable to conduct military operations against guerrilla units of the rebels, attacked peaceful Kazakh villages. To deprive the rebels of the support of auls, the head of the military board ordered to push "Kirghiz-Kaisak bandits" to the Emba river.

Strengthening of confrontation and open help of khan Nuraly to the Cossack punitive detachments have led S.Datuly to a conclusion on the necessity of removal of Nuraly from a khan throne. In the management of Juz's plan, S.Datuly consisted in the removal of the one-man rule of Khan and the transfer of power to the Council of Biys. In 1785 a meeting of biys of Junior Juz decided to remove Nuraly khan from power and henceforth prevent the election of his close relatives to the khan's throne.

In 1797 the Orenburg administration, hoping to win the favor of S. Datuly, did not include a representative of the Nuraly Khan family in the Khan Council. The main result of the rebellion led by Batyr Syrym should be considered a decision of the government of 11 March 1801, which allowed the Kazakhs to be nomadic on the right bank of the Urals.

The rebellion led by Syram Datuly was the largest anti-colonial rebellion on the southeastern outskirts of the Russian Empire at the end of the XVIII century.

The rebellion of 1783–1797 was of great historical significance and showed that tribal antagonisms are unacceptable and dangerous in the organization of popular uprisings. In 1797, avoiding persecution by the supporters of Sultan, S. Datuly left with his cronies for the Khiva borders.

The 19th century

In 1822-1824,an uprising led by the batyr Zholaman Tlenshiuly.

In 1824-1825 there was an uprising led by the last khan of the Middle Zhuz Gubaydulla.

In 1826-1838, an uprising led by Sultan Kaiyp-Gali Yesimuly.

Uprising in the Bukey Horde

In 1801, 5,000 Kazakh households headed by Bukey Khan moved to the Volga-Ural interfluve, which marked the beginning of the formation of the Inner (Bukey) Horde. By the end of the '30s, there were already about 20,000 households and 80,000 people in it. Land and pastures were distributed unevenly. In a short time, 2/3 of the land became the private property of Kazakh feudal lords and Russian landlords.
 
Khan Zhangir Bukeyev (1825–1845) regarded the territory of the Horde as his own domain, defended the interests of colonizers. The arbitrariness which Zhangir's relatives committed against the people went unpunished. All this caused discontent and pushed the masses to revolt.
The anti-feudal and anti-colonial nature of the uprising caused dual oppression of the Kazakh sharua by royal officials, landlords, and local feudal lords. The reason for the revolt was the appointment of Karauylkoji Babazhanov, the son-in-law of Zhangir Khan, as the ruler of the Kazakh clans that were roaming the Caspian Sea region in 1833.

The main driving force behind the uprising was the Kazakh sharuas. Some elders and biies took part in the uprising. Change of clan leaders to the side of Zhangir Khan and the king's troops in connection with the weakening of the rebellion hastened its defeat.

The rebellion in the Bukeyev Horde is divided into three periods:

 1833–1836 – the formation of the main prerequisites of the uprising;
 1837 – development of the uprising, the clash of the rebels with the Tsarist punitive detachments and subordinates of Zhangir Khan;
 3 December 1837 – July 1838 – Weakening of the rebellion and defeat of the uprising.

The rebellion was led by foremen Isatai Taimanov and Makhambet Utemisov. In 1812 Bukey Khan appointed Isatai Taimanov as the foreman of the Zhaiyk branch of the Bersh tribe. In 1814 he was approved in the seniority by the Orenburg frontier commission. In 1817 and 1823 Isatai was brought to trial on the accusations of the Orenburg governor but was acquitted. In 1826 he accompanied the ambassador of the Khan of Bukhara. In 1835 Isatai wrote a letter to the khan, in which he asked to protect the people from the outrages of Karaulkoja.
A companion of Isatai, the warrior-poet Makhambet Utemisov was the elder of the Bersh tribe. He played a special role in defining the aims of the uprising. One can get an idea of the main demands of the rebels from Makhambet's verses addressed to Zhangir Khan and Sultan Baimagambet, the executor of the Khan's will.
The main aims of the movement were the restriction of the khan's omnipotence, improvement of the situation of the sharuas, and changing the imperialist land policy.

The revolt began with separate actions against Zhangir and his subordinates. Since February 1836 the rebellion in Bukey Horde took on a national liberation character. The number of rebels was increasing. At the end of October 1836 under the banner of Isatai passed 20 more auls.
Disturbed by the strengthening of authority Isatai among the people the petty officers supporting khan Zhangir, in December 1836 have made a sudden attack on auls Makhambet and Tinally Taisoganuly, having plundered property and having driven away cattle.
On-demand of the Orenburg governor V.A. Perovsky, ataman Pokatilov with a detachment of 200 Cossacks attempted to capture Isatai. The attempt ended in failure, Isatai's detachment of 1,000 men were joined by other detachments of the Bukey Horde.
 
The events at the end of 1836 in Bukeyev Horde became known in St Petersburg. Nicholai I demanded that the leaders of the rebellion be severely punished. To coordinate the suppression of rebellion Orenburg governor V. Perovsky appointed Lieutenant Colonel Geke, assigning him additional military forces.
On 15 October 1837, not far from the Terekti-Kum area Isatay and Makhambet units have crushed the aul of bey Balky Kudaibergenuly, the approximate of Zhangir khan. At the end of October 1837 the rebels, numbering 2,000 men, laid siege to the khan's residence.
The defeat of Isatay's troops on 15 November 1837, at the battle of Tastobe, influenced the further course of the revolt. The number of rebels was reduced. For this battle, Geke was promoted to the rank of Colonel. Punishment of auls that supported the rebels could cause a general resentment in Bukey Horde, so at the suggestion of lieutenant colonel Geke they were forgiven, and cattle seized from the rebels was distributed among sultans and feudal lords of Zhangir Khan.
The rebellion was weakened.
The royal administration promised 1,000 roubles for the capture of Isatai and 500 roubles for his head. Having failed to achieve their objective, Gheke's detachment returned to the Kulagin fortress.
On 13 December 1837, having broken through the barrier line near Zhamankala fortress, Isatai went to the territory of Junior Juz, which coincided in time with sharua movement caused by Kenesary Kasymov's rebellion. Kenesary's units found support among the kypshak, argyn, then zhagalbayly and tabyn tribes who were roaming in the Turgai area. Kenesary was joined by detachments of Zholaman Tlenshiev on the banks of the Ilek. In January 1838 Isatay's detachment approached Lake Shoshkakol and the Mountain Fortress, posing a threat to the Ural military line.

In the last phase of the uprising, Isatai Taimanov's aim was to spread the rebellion into the Bukeyev Horde. The governor subordinated all military groups to Colonel Danilevsky to fight the rebels. He instructed Sultan Baimagambet Aishuakov to set up an armed group to pursue Isatai.

The last battle between Isatai Taimanov's detachments and the royal troops took place on 12 July 1838 in Akbulak. In the battle, about 80 insurgents were killed. Heavily wounded Isatai was shot. A part of the insurgents led by Makhambet Utemisov continued to fight. But the persecution of the rebels intensified and he was forced to retreat to the borders of Khiva.

In October 1839 Makhambet secretly returned to Bukeyev Horde. In 1841 he was captured by the punitive forces and taken first to Guryev, then to the Urals fortress. The verdict of the military court confined his exile to the Bukeyev Horde. In October 1846 Makhambet was treacherously murdered by the followers of Sultan Baimagambet.

The massacre of the captured insurgents was harsh, but most of the insurgents managed to take refuge among their fellow tribesmen. In order not to cause further discontent among the Kazakh sharuas of the Bukeyev Horde, the prosecution was dropped.

The uprising of Kenesary Kasymuly

In the 20s of the XIX century, part of the Senior Juz, the southern areas of the Middle and Junior Juz were under the rule of the Kokand and Khiva beks. In the lower reaches of the Syr Darya, the Khanate of Khiva erected a number of fortresses.
 
In the 1820s, the struggle of Kazakh people for their rights was headed by the grandson of khan Ablay Sarzhan. By order of the Kokand, Sarzhan Kasimuly was assassinated in Tashkent in 1836. In the 20-30s of the XIX century Sultan Kasym (father of Kenesary) in his letters to the Russian Emperor asked not to change the political order of the Kazakhs, not to infringe upon the freedom of the people, and abolish the districts and orders.
 
The rebellion led by Sultan Kenesary Kasymuly took place in 1837–1847. The rebellion had a national liberation character. The insurrection of 1837–1847 was mainly aimed at preserving the independence of the provinces, which were not independent. -It was aimed at preserving the independence of the lands that were not part of Russia. The rebellion led by Kenesary Kasymuly aimed not only to stop the colonization of the Kazakh lands by imperialist Russia but also to free the Kazakhs of the southern regions from under the rule of the Kokand.
 
Kenesary demanded that Russia restore the independence of the Kazakh Steppe under Abylai Khan, cease collecting taxes and liquidate the fortresses. Kenesary's representatives, sent to deliver a letter to the West Siberian Governor-General and Tsar Nikolai I, were captured and punished.
 
The Kazakhs of three juzes actively participated in the rebellion of 1837–1847 under the leadership of Kenesary. Batyr Nauryzbai, Kenesary's younger brother and his staunch associate was the leader of the detachments during the uprising. In May 1838 Sultan Kenesary's detachments captured the Akmola fortress.
 
230,000 royal army was captured by Kenesary Khan, more than 180,000 of them were shot as a punishment, the rest were sold into slavery in Bukhara, and 264,541 royal army was enslaved by the alshin tribe in the western Kazakh khanate
 
The movement led by Sultan Kenesary was joined by detachments under the leadership of bey Zholaman Tilenshiuly. The reason for the revolt, under the leadership of biy Zholaman Tilenshiuly, was the creation of the Novoiletskaya military line.
 
In 1841 Kenesary's troops captured a number of Kokand fortresses in Kazakhstan: Zhanakorgan, Sozak, Akmeshit. After the capture of the Kokand fortresses, in 1841 the rebel Kazakhs of three juzes elected Kenesary khan.
 
In July 1844 the rebels led by Kenesary defeated the punitive detachment of Sultan Zhantoreuly. Successful military action by Kenesary in 1844 forced the Orenburg administration to begin negotiations with him. To leave Kazakhstan in its former position – these were the demands of the royal ambassadors to Kenesary during the uprising of 1837–1847.
 
The main condition for the forgiveness of the rebels in 1837–1847 was the recognition of the Orenburg region as part of Russia. To combat the rebels led by Kenesary, the tsarist government urgently erected fortresses along the Yrgyz and Torgai rivers.
 
The state-organized during Kenesary's rebellion was feudal. At the height of the rebellion, Kenesary held a meeting where the plan of the rebellion and the possibility of seeking help from China were considered.
 
After taking the khan's power into his own hands in 1841, Kenesary introduced the Khan's Court. The Khan Council, headed by Kenesary, consisted of people devoted to the objectives of the liberation struggle, who displayed heroism and diplomatic skills. During the uprising, groups of officials were established to control financial matters, collection of customs duties, and taxes. In Kenesary Kasymuly's forces, betrayal was punishable by the death penalty.
 
After taking the khan's power into his own hands in 1841, Kenesary eradicated internecine quarrels, barimta (cattle raiding), introduced changes in military affairs – formation of volunteer detachments.
 
The Kyrgyz manaps left unanswered Kenesary's proposal to join forces against the Kokand Khanate.
 
The largest rebellion of the first half of the XIX century against the Russian colonial oppression – an uprising led by K. Kasymov was defeated. The political disunity of the Kazakhs was the main reason for the defeat of the 1837–1847 revolt led by Kenesary Kasymov.
 
Kenesary Kasymov fought against Bukhara and Kokand, but failed to form a coalition against Tsarist Russia. During the uprising of 1837 – 1847 the leaders of the main clans of Zhetisu inclined towards Russia.

Uprisings after Kenesary Khan

In the years 1853-1857 - an uprising under led by batyr Eset Kotibaruli.

In 1856-1858 there was an uprising
led by the batyr Zhankozha Nurmukhammeduly in the Syr Darya.

Aday uprising 1860-1870

In the second half of the 19th century, colonial dependence of the Kazakh steppe was strengthened by reforms of 1867–1868. Under the reforms of 1867 – 1868 Kazakh lands were declared state property of the Russian Empire.

Kazakhs paid a tax for working and living in nearby Russian settlements. There were rebellions against the colonial reforms of 1867–1868 in the Ural and Turgay regions.

The Adai tribe rebelled against the reforms of 1867–1868 in the territory of Mangistau in 1870. In 1870 the defeat of Rukin's detachment served as a signal to start the liberation movement in Mangistau against the reforms of 1867–1868. One of the specific features of the uprising in the territory of Mangistau in 1870 was that for the first time Kazakh hired workers took part in the movement.

The 20th century

Central Asian revolt of 1916

In the Kyrgyzstan and Kazakhstan Anti-Russian uprising by the indigenous inhabitants of Russian Turkestan sparked by the conscription of Muslim into the Russian military for service on the Eastern Front during World War I. The rampant corruption of the Russian colonial regime and Tsarist colonialism in all its economic, political, religious, and national dimensions are all seen as the contributing causes.

Revolts against Soviet Russia

During the period from 1928 to 1932, 372 uprisings took place in Kazakhstan, generated by the policy of sovietization of the village", tax in kinds, collectivization and dekulakization

Uprising against China

In 1941, the Kazakhs raised an uprising in China. The reason for it was the dissatisfaction of the Kazakhs with the fact that the government of Sheng Shicai transferred pastures and watering places to settled peasants - Dungans and Chinese.

References

Rebellions in Asia
History of Kazakhstan

Links

Revolt led by Syrym Datuly in the junior zhuz

Kazakhs in the Pugachev's rebellion. Chapter: Economy.

Uprising in the Bukey Horde

The uprising of Kenesary Kasymuly

Aday uprising 1860-1870

Central Asian revolt of 1916

372 uprising against Soviet Russia

Uprising against Soviet Union and China